This is the discography of albums recorded by Norwegian pianist Ketil Bjørnstad.

Studio albums

1970s

1980s

1990s

2000s

2010s

Live albums

 Life in Leipzig with Terje Rypdal (ECM, 2008)
 Hvalenes Sang (Oratorium) (Grappa, 2010)

Compilations/bundles

 Tredje dag/Svart piano (Philips, 2 CD re-release 1994)
 Ophelia's Arrival/Pianology/Minotauros, three ballets (Hermitage (1994 re-release) 3 × LPs
 Early Years (Universal, 2000)
 Early Piano Music (Hubro, 19 July 2011) Preludes and Pianology
 Images/ Shimmering  (Grappa, 2015)

Other albums
 Och människor ser igen, Lill Lindfors, written and arranged by Bjørnstad (Metronome, 1980)
 La elva leve! (Kolibri, 1980, contributed one track)
 Manniskors makt for Lill Lindfors, lyrics by Edith Sodergran (1985)
 Losrivelse Kari Bremnes, lyrics by Edvard Munch (KKV, 1993)
 Davidsalmer, Anders Wyller, lyrics from the bible (KKV, 1995)
 Sanger fra en Klode for Per Vollestad (Grappa, 1995)
 Salomos Hoysang written for Lill Lindfors & Tommy Nilsson, lyrics from the bible (KKV, 1995)

References 

Ketil Bjørnstad albums

de:Ketil Bjørnstad#Diskographie .28Auswahl.29
es:Ketil Bjørnstad#Discograf.C3.ADa
it:Ketil Bjørnstad#Discografia essenziale
nl:Ketil Bjørnstad#Discografie
ja:ケティル・ビヨルンスタ#.E3.83.87.E3.82.A3.E3.82.B9.E3.82.B3.E3.82.B0.E3.83.A9.E3.83.95.E3.82.A3
no:Ketil Bjørnstad#Diskografi
nn:Ketil Bjørnstad#Plateutgjevingar
pt:Ketil Bjørnstad#Discografia